Several lakes are known as Walker Lake:

Canada
Lake Walker in Quebec, Canada, the largest (by depth) lake in the province.

United States
Walker Lake (Haines, Alaska)
Walker Lake (Northwest Arctic, Alaska)
Walker Lake (Prince of Wales-Outer Ketchikan CA, Alaska)
Walker Lake (Calhoun County, Arkansas)
Walker Lake (Idaho)
Lake Walker (Gaithersburg, Maryland)
Walker Lake (Nevada)
Walker Lake, Nevada, a community along the lake
Walker Lake (Pennsylvania)
Mountain Meadows Reservoir, also known as Walker Lake